Rosenau Head is a steep, ice-covered coastal headland located on the east side of Barber Glacier in the Bowers Mountains. Mapped by United States Geological Survey (USGS) from surveys and U.S. Navy air photos, 1960–62. Named by Advisory Committee on Antarctic Names (US-ACAN) for Darrell D. Rosenau, U.S. Navy, electronics technician at the South Pole Station, 1965.
 

Headlands of Victoria Land
Pennell Coast